The Zamboni is a student-run humor publication at Tufts University. It was founded in 1989 and comes out with six issues per year, or once per month.  It contains satirical articles (such as fake news briefs, interviews, and op-ed pieces), cartoons, and photos.  It is known as "Tufts University's Only Intentionally Funny Magazine" and its motto is "Cowering Behind the First Amendment Since 1989." The Zamboni is fully funded by the Student Activities Fee as allocated by the Tufts Senate.

In 2014, The Zamboni started publishing digitally, and became part of more experimental humor ventures. As of 2014, The Zamboni creates pieces of installation art, multimedia, sketch comedy, and pranks, among other non-print projects.

History 

The Zamboni was founded by Josh Wolk (Class of '91) in the fall of 1989 with the help of a Tufts Daily layout artist, Nicole Pierce. Wolk described his reason for creating the magazine as:

"It was basically a reaction to what we felt was a lack of sense of humor on campus (this was in the dawning days of political correctness). It was also a slightly embittered reaction to the fact that the guys at the Harvard Lampoon were sitting in a castle just two cities away and getting every TV writing job as soon as they graduated. Crimson bastards." 

The name itself came from Wolk, who always expressed amusement of the concept of an actual Zamboni.  "It just seemed silly to be a guy driving a machine around the ice."  He created the letter from the editor sign-off of "Ain't that a kick in the head?" which still continues to this day.  The original staff was mostly seniors, and the first issues poked fun at the TCU Senate and on-campus fraternities.  One such example included a full page parody of a Delta Tau Delta rush ad.  DTD responded with an ad in the Daily that referred to The Zamboni as "Dorkman Zamboni," a shout-out that the original staff proudly embraced.

After a "dry period" between the mid-1990s and early 2000s, The Zamboni went through a revitalization in content and structure in 2013, led by then-Managing Editor Graham Starr. Adopting a "print is dead, long live print!" attitude, the Zamboni pushed more toward the conceptual art community at Tufts, and has been focusing more on experimental comedy and multimedia and digital content. The Zamboni has kept its initial print nature and still publishes monthly, but is also using its newfound freedom of "not having to care" as good excuse into other, less-traveled avenues of humor. The Zamboni has also positioned itself into an artist and comedian sandbox on campus for humorists, designers, writers, and artists to try out new content and develop in a safe and supportive space.

Organization structure 

The Zamboni is a student group funded by the TCU Senate. It has three main positions that operate and oversee the organization and development of the club and magazine: The editor in chief, the managing editor, and the editor-at-large. Up to two people are allowed to serve as co-editor in chief or co-managing editor at one time, and oversee most of the general organization of the magazine and organization. There is no limit on the number of members that may serve as editors-at-large at the same time.

In spring 2015, the Zamboni rewrote its constitution to prepare for the next generation of humor content. The new board includes six positions: the editor-in-chief, managing editor, creative director, digital manager, publicity director, and editor-at-large. This restructuring focuses the Zamboni more on digital and multimedia content.

Elections for positions are typically held at the end of the academic year in April or May.

Format 

Originally, The Zamboni was developed as being fourteen pages every issue in addition to a front and back cover.  The average issue contains a word from the editor, two to three pages of fake news briefs, followed by two pages of campus news, a center spread dealing with the theme of the issue, and then more pages of miscellaneous content, also often concerning the issue's theme (which is on the cover).  Recurring features include The Zamboni Interviews and The Zamboni Roasts.  The fourth or fifth issue every year is a parody issue, which mimics the style of another publication, on or off-campus.

Currently, The Zamboni is either twenty or twenty-four pages long (including front and back cover, and is divided by section. Sections are established by the amount of content amassed per issue, and the issue theme is used to tie the creative development of the magazine together. There are no required sections and they all may change at whim. It is entirely possible that one issue during the year is printed backwards while all the others are printed forwards. Or that only one is printed forwards and the others printed backwards. The palindromic nature of chaos is a large and necessary part of the new Zamboni.

Historically, The Zamboni has endured a variety of changes in layout format and editorial direction. It was published in a 12–16 page broadsheet tabloid format on conventional newsprint throughout the 1990s. The success of the 1999 "student notebook parody" (itself a homage to The National Lampoon's High School Yearbook) led to a change in format. In fall 2000, with the publication moved to a conventional multicolor staplebound magazine-style layout centered around a singular theme, similar to the National Lampoon magazines of the 1970s.

In the fall of 2013, the editors returned the format to a more conventional magazine style, with standardized magazine layout. This was a change from the previous newspaper tabloid style of the magazine, and focuses more on artistic direction, photo manipulation, and article-based content. The new layout consists of 20–24 page issues, including a front and back cover, where the outside spread is off glossy and brightly colored format, while the inside sheets are of a black-and-white magazine print, inspired by Bitch Magazine, which the editors enjoyed reading.

In the fall of 2014, 'The Zamboni' launched its website and non-print content. As of spring 2015, 'The Zamboni' publishes certain content in exclusively digital format in addition to its print publication. In 2014 'The Zamboni' also became involved in mixed media and installation art pieces as auxiliaries to publication ventures.

Current developments 

In spring of 2006, The Zamboni ran a parody of the Weekly World News.  This parody entailed a change in style from the then-used magazine format (book with staples) to a larger folded-tabloid format.  This change proved so popular that, beginning in 2006–2007, that format became the regular one of The Zamboni.  This allowed more space per issue, leading to an increase in photos and articles.  News briefs particularly expanded, going from one page with no pictures, to three pages, often with a picture per article.

As of the fall of 2009, The Zamboni has its front and back covers in addition to the sixth and seventh pages in color.

In the fall of 2013, the editors redesigned the layout to a more recognizable, stylistic, and appealing format, reverting to a magazine style from the previous "tabloid" layout. Only the outside spread is in color, while the inside pages are in standard magazine grayscale. The new format includes several fake advertisements and a page for coupons to be used at on-campus establishments. These coupons are intentionally humorous in nature and no actual establishment was consulted in advance for the creation of these coupons. They are a ruse, a prank, and not to be taken seriously, or used seriously.

In the fall of 2013, The Zamboni also established an online presence, social media presence, and expanded its scope of operation to include different kinds of humorous ventures. such as pranks or video humor.

In the fall of 2014, The Zamboni established ventures in installation art and mixed media, creating fake statues and art exhibits on campus. In April 2015, amid the arrival of the new Jumbo statue, 'The Zamboni' staff made a cardboard replica and placed it on campus where the official statue would have gone.

In spring 2015, The Zamboni launched its website and started publishing digital-only content in addition to its other projects.

Controversy 
As Tufts's humor magazine, The Zamboni has sometimes sparked controversy with its articles.  During one 2005 issue, an article was run that gave a list of how-tos to get kicked out of clubs on campus. One joke said that to get kicked out of SSARA (a sexual assault counseling group) one should say, "With an outfit like that, you should have expected it," to which some students took offense. The Zamboni responded to the controversy in the following week's Tufts Daily opinion section.

Editors-in-chief 
The names of many The Zamboni's editors-in-chief appeared in the publication's 100th issue. Former editors-in-chief include:
 1989–1991: Josh Wolk
 1991–1992:
 1992–1993: 
 1993–1994: 
 1994–1995: Amy Butler 
 1995–1996: Adam Kraemer
 1996–1997: Bill Copeland
 1997–1998: Adam Lenter
 1998–1999: Gabe Guarente
 1999–2000: Joshua Saipe
 2000–2001: James Lubin
 2001–2002: Eli Kazin 
 2002–2003: Andrew Kambour
 2003–2005: Brett Weiner
 2005–2006: Julie Nogee & Stephanie Vallejo
 2006–2007: Stephanie Vallejo & Francis Dahl
 2007–2008: Mike Yarsky
 2008–2009: Devin Toohey
 2009–2010: Matthew Luz & Michael Schecht
 2010–2011: Ryan Oliveira
 2011–2012: Matt McGowen
 2012–2013: Andrew Reisman
 2013–2014: William Owen & Laura Rathsmill
 2014–2015: Graham Starr
 2015–2016: Rachel Rappaport
 2016–2017: Ryan Hastings-Echo & Emily Garber
 2017–2018: Craig Drennan & Jess Silverman
 2018–2019: Jess Silverman & Sam Cowger
 2019–2020: Charles Bunnell IV & Elaine Harris
 2020–2021: Conor Moriarty

References

External links
The Zamboni's official website
Directory of past issues (in .pdf format)

Student magazines published in the United States
College humor magazines
Humor magazines
Magazines established in 1989
Tufts University
Tufts University publications
Magazines published in Massachusetts
Monthly magazines published in the United States